Honorine Delescluse was a French gymnast. She competed in the women's artistic team all-around event at the 1928 Summer Olympics.

References

Year of birth missing
Year of death missing
French female artistic gymnasts
Olympic gymnasts of France
Gymnasts at the 1928 Summer Olympics
Place of birth missing
20th-century French women